Powe is an unincorporated community in southwest Stoddard County, in the U.S. state of Missouri.  The community is on Missouri Route U 2.5 miles east of the St. Francis River and two miles north of the Stoddard-Dunklin county line.

History
A post office called Powe was established in 1904, and remained in operation until 1929. The community has the name of the Powe family, original owners of the town site.

References

Census-designated places in Stoddard County, Missouri
1904 establishments in Missouri